Foreign Girls is an EP from singer-songwriter Joseph Arthur, released July 8, 2008, and is the last of a series of EPs released in anticipation for Arthur's seventh studio album, Temporary People.

Arthur referred to the EP in an Orlando Weekly interview:

The song "Foreign Girls" first appeared as a poem and a recording on Joseph's MySpace page on April 13, 2008.

Track listing

Notes
 Produced and engineered by Joseph Arthur.
 Joseph Arthur: vocals, guitars, bass, keyboards, drums, percussion, and programming.
 Background vocals on "Foreign Girls" and "Candy and Cars" by Cerise Leang.
 Art direction and packaging design by Joseph Arthur and Lauren Pattenaude.
 Front cover photo by Edith Muniz.
 Back cover photo by Cerise Leang.
 Lonely Astronaut Records #LA006.

References

Joseph Arthur albums
2008 EPs
Lonely Astronaut Records EPs